Cupid's Brand is a 1921 American silent Western film directed by Rowland V. Lee and starring Jack Hoxie, Wilbur McGaugh and Mignon Anderson.

Cast
 Jack Hoxie as Reese Wharton
 Wilbur McGaugh as 'Spike' Crowder
 Charles Force as 'Bull' Devlin
 Mignon Anderson as Neva Hedden
 William Dyer as Slade Crosby
 A.T. Van Sicklen as Steve Heden

References

External links
 

1921 films
1921 Western (genre) films
Films directed by Rowland V. Lee
Arrow Film Corporation films
Silent American Western (genre) films
1920s English-language films
1920s American films